Click and collect may refer to:

 Alternative name for Omnichannel retail strategy
 Click & Collect, a British comedy TV film